Brandon Dale Glover (born 3 April 1997) is a Dutch-South African cricketer who has played for the Netherlands national cricket team since 2019. He has also played for Boland in South African domestic cricket and for Northamptonshire in English county cricket. He is a right-arm pace bowler.

Personal life
Glover was born on 3 April 1997 in Johannesburg, South Africa. He holds a Dutch passport through his Dutch mother. He studied accounting at the University of Stellenbosch.

Domestic and franchise cricket
Glover made his first-class debut for Boland in the 2016–17 Sunfoil 3-Day Cup on 20 October 2016. He made his List A debut for Boland in the 2016–17 CSA Provincial One-Day Challenge on 26 March 2017.

In July 2019, he was selected to play for the Amsterdam Knights in the inaugural edition of the Euro T20 Slam cricket tournament. However, the following month the tournament was cancelled.

In August 2020, he played his first match for Northamptonshire County Cricket Club, in the 2020 Bob Willis Trophy.

International cricket
Glover trained with the Dutch squad prior to the 2018 Cricket World Cup Qualifier at the invitation of head coach Ryan Campbell. He subsequently began playing for Voorburg Cricket Club in The Hague. In March 2019, he was selected in the national training squad, and in June 2019 he was named in the Netherlands' squad for their series against Zimbabwe. He made his One Day International (ODI) debut for the Netherlands against Zimbabwe on 21 June 2019. He made his Twenty20 International (T20I) debut for the Netherlands against Zimbabwe on 23 June 2019.

In September 2019, he was named in the Dutch squad for the 2019 ICC T20 World Cup Qualifier tournament in the United Arab Emirates. He was the leading wicket-taker for the Netherlands in the tournament, with sixteen dismissals in eight matches.

In September 2021, Glover was named in the Dutch squad for the 2021 ICC Men's T20 World Cup.

References

External links
 

1997 births
Living people
Dutch cricketers
Netherlands One Day International cricketers
Netherlands Twenty20 International cricketers
South African cricketers
Boland cricketers
Northamptonshire cricketers
Cricketers from Johannesburg
South African emigrants to the Netherlands